The Moorings 335 is an American sailboat that was designed by the Hunter Design Team for Moorings Yacht Charter and first built in 1994.

The Moorings 335 is a development of the Hunter 29.5 specially for the charter market.

Production
The design was built for Moorings by Hunter Marine in the United States, but it is now out of production. The design is no longer in service with Moorings and the fleet has been sold for private use.

Design
The Moorings 295 is a recreational keelboat, built predominantly of fiberglass. It has a fractional sloop rig, an internally-mounted spade-type rudder controlled by a wheel and a fixed fin keel. It displaces  and carries  of ballast.

See also
List of sailing boat types

Related development
Hunter 29.5
Moorings 335

Similar sailboats
C&C 30
Cal 29
Catalina 30
CS 30
Hunter 30
Hunter 30T
Hunter 30-2
Hunter 306
Kirby 30
Mirage 30
Mirage 30 SX
Nonsuch 30

References

Keelboats
1990s sailboat type designs
Sailing yachts
Sailboat type designs by Hunter Design Team
Sailboat types built by Hunter Marine